Nosthush Pradeep Kenjige (born March 2, 1991) is an American cricketer who made his debut for the U.S. national side in May 2017 in the 2017 ICC World Cricket League Division Three in Uganda. He is a left-handed batsman and left-arm orthodox bowler.

Career
Kenjige was born in Auburn, Alabama, where his father worked as an agricultural research at Tuskegee University. He and his family moved back to India before he turned one, to Chikkamagaluru District, outside Bengaluru, where his father runs a coffee farm. Kenjige played university cricket in Bengaluru. He moved back to the U.S. in 2015, first to Virginia and then to New York, where he found worked as a biological technician.

In January 2018, he was named in the United States squad for the 2017–18 Regional Super50 tournament in the West Indies. He made his List A debut for the United States against the Leeward Islands in the 2017–18 Regional Super50 on January 31, 2018.

In August 2018, he was named in the United States' squad for the 2018–19 ICC World Twenty20 Americas Qualifier tournament in Morrisville, North Carolina. He was the leading wicket-taker in the tournament, with twelve dismissals in six matches. In October 2018, he was named in the United States' squads for the 2018–19 Regional Super50 tournament in the West Indies and for the 2018 ICC World Cricket League Division Three tournament in Oman.

In February 2019, he was named in the United States' Twenty20 International (T20I) squad for their series against the United Arab Emirates, but he did not play. The matches were the first T20I fixtures to be played by the United States cricket team. In April 2019, he was named in the United States cricket team's squad for the 2019 ICC World Cricket League Division Two tournament in Namibia.

In June 2019, he was named in a 30-man training squad for the United States cricket team, ahead of the Regional Finals of the 2018–19 ICC T20 World Cup Americas Qualifier tournament in Bermuda. The following month, he was one of twelve players to sign a three-month central contract with USA Cricket. In September 2019, he was named in United States's One Day International (ODI) squad for the 2019 United States Tri-Nation Series. In November 2019, he was named in the United States' squad for the 2019–20 Regional Super50 tournament.

In December 2019, he was named in the United States' One Day International (ODI) squad for the 2019 United Arab Emirates Tri-Nation Series. He made his ODI debut for the United States, against the United Arab Emirates on December 8, 2019.

In June 2021, he was selected to take part in the Minor League Cricket tournament in the United States following the players' draft.

References

External links
 

1991 births
Living people
American cricketers
Sportspeople from Auburn, Alabama
American people of Kannada descent
American sportspeople of Indian descent
United States One Day International cricketers